The European honey buzzard (Pernis apivorus), also known as the pern or common pern, is a bird of prey in the family Accipitridae.

Etymology
Despite its English name, this species is more closely related to kites of the genera Leptodon and Chondrohierax than to true buzzards in Buteo. The binomen is derived from Ancient Greek pernes πέρνης, a term used by Aristotle for a bird of prey, and Latin apivorus "bee-eating", from apis, "bee" and -vorus, "-eating". In fact, bees are much less important than wasps in the birds' diet. Note that it is accordingly called  ("wasp buzzard") in German and similarly in some other Germanic languages and also in Hungarian ("darázsölyv").

Description

The -long honey buzzard is larger and longer winged, with a  wingspan, when compared to the smaller common buzzard (Buteo buteo). It appears longer necked with a small head, and soars on flat wings. It has a longer tail, which has fewer bars than the Buteo buzzard, usually with two narrow dark bars and a broad dark subterminal bar. The sexes can be distinguished on plumage, which is unusual for a large bird of prey. The male has a blue-grey head, while the female's head is brown. The female is slightly larger and darker than the male.

The soaring jizz is quite diagnostic; the wings are held straight with the wing tips horizontal or sometimes slightly pointed down. The head protrudes forwards with a slight kink downwards and sometimes a very angular chest can be seen, similar to a sparrowhawk, although this may not be diagnostic. The angular chest is most pronounced when seen in direct flight with tail narrowed. The call is a clear peee-lu.

Distribution and habitat
The European honey buzzard is a summer migrant to  a relatively small area in the western Palearctic from most of Europe to as far east as southwestern Siberia. The eastern area boundary is not yet known exactly, it is thought to be  in the Tomsk–Novosibirsk–Barnaul area. It is seen in a wide range of habitats, but generally prefers woodland and exotic plantations. It migrates to tropical Africa for European winters.

Movements
Being a long-distance migrant, the honey buzzard relies on magnetic orientation to find its way south, as well as a visual memory of remarkable geographical features such as mountain ranges and rivers, along the way. It avoids large expanses of water over which it cannot soar. Accordingly, great numbers of honey buzzards can be seen crossing the Mediterranean Sea over its narrowest stretches, such as the Gibraltar Strait, the Messina Strait, the Bosphorus, Lebanon, or in Israel.

Status in Britain
The bird is an uncommon breeder in, and a scarce though increasing migrant to, Britain. Its most well-known summer population is in the New Forest (Hampshire) but it is also found in the Tyne Valley (Northumberland), Wareham Forest (Dorset), Swanton Novers Great Wood (Norfolk), the Neath Valleys (South Wales), the Clumber Park area (Nottinghamshire), near Wykeham Forest (North Yorkshire), Haldon Forest Park (Devon) and elsewhere.

Mimicry
The similarity in plumage between juvenile European honey buzzard and common buzzard may have arisen as a partial protection against predation by northern goshawks. Although that formidable predator is capable of killing both species, it is likely to be more cautious about attacking the better protected Buteo species, with its stronger bill and talons. Similar Batesian mimicry is shown by the Asian Pernis species, which resemble the Spizaetus hawk-eagles.

Behaviour
It is sometimes seen soaring in thermals. When flying in wooded vegetation, honey buzzards usually fly quite low and perch in midcanopy, holding the body relatively horizontal with its tail drooping. The bird also hops from branch to branch, each time flapping its wings once, and so emitting a loud clap. The bird often appears restless with much ruffling of the wings and shifting around on its perch. The honey buzzard often inspects possible locations of food from its perch, cocking its head this way and that to get a good look at possible food locations. This behaviour is reminiscent of an inquisitive parrot.

Breeding

The honey buzzard breeds in woodland, and is inconspicuous except in the spring, when the mating display includes wing-clapping. Breeding males are fiercely territorial. The clutch typically consists of two eggs, less often one or three. Siblicide is rarely observed.

Feeding
It is a specialist feeder, living mainly on the larvae and nests of wasps and hornets, although it will take small mammals, reptiles, and birds. It is the only known predator of the Asian hornet. It spends large amounts of time on the forest floor excavating wasp nests. It is equipped with long toes and claws adapted to raking and digging, and scale-like feathering on its head, thought to be a defence against the stings of its prey. Honey buzzards are thought to have a chemical deterrent in their feathers that protects them from wasp attacks.

In culture
The honey buzzard was historically considered a winter delicacy in Europe, with 19th century texts stating it was frequently caught in winter and described as “fat and delicious eating”.

References

External links

 (European) honey buzzard species text in The Atlas of Southern African Birds
 Ageing and sexing (PDF; 5.4 MB) by Javier Blasco Zumeta & Gerd-Michael Heinze
 European Honey-Buzzard Text, map, photographs and audio at Oiseaux.net
 Honey-buzzard in Britain Identification, calls, movements.
 
 
 
 
 

European honey buzzard
Birds of prey of Africa
Birds of prey of Europe
European honey buzzard
European honey buzzard
Articles containing video clips